General elections were held in Barbados on 24 May 2018. The result was a landslide victory for the opposition Barbados Labour Party (BLP), which won all 30 seats in the House of Assembly, resulting in BLP leader Mia Mottley becoming the country's first female Prime Minister. The BLP's victory was the first time a party had won every seat in the House of Assembly. Previously, the most one-sided result for a Barbadian election had been in 1999, when the BLP won 26 of the 28 seats. The BLP's 73.5 percent vote share was also the highest on record.

The ruling Democratic Labour Party (DLP) led by Freundel Stuart lost all 16 seats, the worst defeat of a sitting government in Barbadian history. The DLP saw its vote share more than halve compared to the previous elections in 2013, with only one of its candidates receiving more than 40 percent of the vote. Stuart was defeated in his own constituency, receiving only 26.7 percent of the vote, the second time a sitting Prime Minister had lost their own seat. It was also the first time since independence that the constituency of St John, a traditionally DLP stronghold, was won by the BLP.

The election was fought primarily on the DLP's stewardship of the economy during its decade in power. The government had had to contend with numerous downgrades of its credit rating due to fallout from the global financial crisis. The BLP criticised the DLP over rising taxes and a declining standard of living, and promised numerous infrastructure upgrades if elected.

Electoral system
The 30 members of the House of Assembly were elected by first-past-the-post voting in single-member constituencies.

Candidates
A record 134 candidates from nine political parties contested the elections. Four of the smaller parties chose to fight together under the 'Coalition of United Parties' banner.

Results

By constituency

Christ Church East

Christ Church East Central

Christ Church South

Christ Church West

Christ Church West Central

City of Bridgetown

St. Andrew

St. George North

St. George South

St. James Central

St. James North

St. James South

St. John

St. Joseph

St. Lucy

St. Michael Central

St. Michael East

St. Michael North

St. Michael North East

St. Michael North West

St. Michael South

St. Michael South Central

St. Michael South East

St. Michael West

St. Michael West Central

St. Peter

St. Philip North

St. Philip South

St. Philip West

St. Thomas

Aftermath
One week after the elections, Joseph Atherley, MP for St. Michael West, crossed the floor to become the House of Assembly's sole opposition member, citing concerns about democracy. He was subsequently appointed Leader of the Opposition. Originally sitting as an independent, he set up his own party, the People's Party for Democracy and Development.

2020 St George North by-election

A by-election was held in the constituency of St George North on 11 November 2020 following the resignation of Gline Clarke, who had represented the constituency for 26 years, to accept the post of Barbadian High Commissioner to Canada. It was the first by-election to take place since the 2018 general election. Toni Moore retained the seat for the BLP.

See also
2020 St George North by-election
List of parliamentary constituencies of Barbados

References

Barbados
2018 in Barbados
Elections in Barbados
May 2018 events in North America
Landslide victories